Minuscule 96 (in the Gregory-Aland numbering), ε 514 (von Soden), is a Greek minuscule manuscript of the New Testament, on paper leaves. Palaeographically it has been assigned to the 15th century. It has marginalia.

Description 

The codex contains the text of the Gospel of John on 62 leaves (size ) with one lacuna (18:18-34). The text is written in one columns per page, 18 lines per page. It is beautifully written.

It does not contain the Pericope Adulterae (John 7:53-8:11).

Kurt Aland did not place the text of the codex in any Category.

History 
The manuscript was beautifully written by Johannes Trithemius († 1516), abbot of Sponheim. Then it belonged to Jan Cornarius († Jena 1558) Achates Cornarius († Kreuznach 1573). In 1607 it was received from Abraham Scultetus by George Hackwell, for the Oxford University library.

It was examined by Ussher (for Walton), Mill (as Trit.), Griesbach (only chapters 3-4), and Tischendorf. It was used in Walton's Polyglott (Trit). C. R. Gregory saw it in 1883.

It is currently housed at the Bodleian Library (MS. Auct. D. 2. 17), at Oxford.

See also 

 List of New Testament minuscules
 Biblical manuscript
 Textual criticism
 Minuscule 96abs

References

Further reading 

 

Greek New Testament minuscules
15th-century biblical manuscripts